Betty Violet Marie Baskcomb (30 May 1914 – 15 April 2003) was a British actress who appeared in roles for theatre, film, television and radio productions. She was born in London in 1914 and made her stage debut as a stooge opposite her father, the comedian A.W. Baskcomb, in 1931. Her screen debut was in the Hitchcock film The Man Who Knew Too Much (1934). Hitchcock insisted she played a part in the remake (released in 1956), and she was flown over to Hollywood for the role, although she was uncredited in both versions. On the radio, she was a member of the BBC Drama Repertory Company from the 1940s through to the 1970s. In 1956 she appeared on stage in Ring For Catty at the Lyric Theatre in London.

Baskcomb was widowed twice, she was married to Anthony Lehmann (1940–1944) and the actor Ronald Ward (1948–1978). She made her last television appearance in 1975, and died in 2003.

Filmography

References

External links

1914 births
2003 deaths
English stage actresses
English film actresses
English television actresses
English radio actresses
People from St John's Wood
People from West Wratting
20th-century British businesspeople